Tugay is a name of Turkish origin which used as a masculine given name and a surname. Notable people with the name is as follows:

Given name
 Tugay Bey (died 1651), Turkic ruler
 Tugay Kaçar (born 1994), Turkish football player
 Tugay Kerimoğlu (born 1970), Turkish football player
 Tugay Uzan (born 1994), Turkish football player

Surname
 Mine Tugay (born 1978), Turkish actress

Turkish masculine given names
Surnames of Turkish origin
Surnames from given names